Basti Lok Sabha constituency is one of the 80 Lok Sabha (parliamentary) constituencies in Uttar Pradesh state in northern India.

Assembly Segments
There are five assembly constituencies in Vidhan Sabha (legislative assembly) segments. These are:

Members of Parliament

^ by poll

Election results

17th Lok Sabha: 2019 General Election

16th Lok Sabha: 2014 General Election

15th Lok Sabha: 2009 General Election

See also
 Basti district
 List of Constituencies of the Lok Sabha
 Basti Khabar

External links
Basti lok sabha  constituency election 2019 result details

References

Lok Sabha constituencies in Uttar Pradesh
Basti district